Suddopuskorini Jubo SC is a Bangladeshi Women's association football from Rangpur. They participate in Bangladesh Women's Football League, the women's premier football league in Bangladesh.

History
The Suddopuskorini Jubo SC  was founded in October 2018. The club will compete in the  2021–22 Bangladesh Women's Football League which starts in 15 November 2022.

Current squad
The following squad were named for 2021–22 BWFL season.

Competitive record

Club management

Current technical staff
As of 5 October 2022

References

2022 establishments in Bangladesh
Dhaka
Association football clubs established in 2022
Women's football clubs in Bangladesh